Acaena antarctica  is a small herbaceous plant in the Rosaceae family native to Argentina, Chile and the Falkland Islands.

Taxonomy and naming
Acaena antarctica was first formally described in 1846 by Joseph Dalton Hooker. Kew holds specimens collected by Hooker from Hermite Island, Cape Horn on the Ross expedition.

The genus name Acaena is derived from the Ancient Greek word akaina meaning "thorn" or "spine", referring to the spiny calyx of many species of Acaena. The specific epithet, antarctica, derives from the Greek (anti, "opposite" and arktos, "bear") and designates the place opposite the constellations of  the Great and the Little Bear, thus describing the species as coming from south of the South Pole circle.

References

External links
Photo of the plant on Flickr
Herbarium specimen images & occurrence data from GBIF

antarctica
Flora of Chile
Flora of Argentina
Taxa named by Joseph Dalton Hooker
Plants described in 1846